Phelan is an unincorporated community and census-designated place in San Bernardino County, California, in the Victor Valley of the Mojave Desert, north of the San Gabriel Mountains. The population was 14,304 in the 2010 census.

Geography
The area around it is nearly flat desert country dotted with joshua trees and heavy brush.

Southwestern areas of Phelan are in the foothills of the San Gabriel Mountains, reaching elevations of more than 4,900 feet above sea level. The town center is at the corner of Phelan and Sheep Creek roads. Most businesses are situated in strip malls dotted along the sides of Phelan Road.

In 2001, according to a feature in the Los Angeles Times, the town was a "wind-swept, tiny unincorporated town nestled in the shadow of a mountain ski resort, just above the vast expanse that is the Mojave Desert. ... There are no shopping malls here, and the closest movie theater is in Victorville, about 15 miles away." Another Times feature said in 1990:

The town of Phelan is surrounded by wide open spaces. There's no mall, and a visit to the beach or Disneyland requires a day's planning. But there is Phelan's Sunshine Market, and when you don't want to drive 20 minutes to Victorville or the local ski areas, you can gaze at the snow-capped peaks through your picture window.

Phelan, along with Victorville, Hesperia, Apple Valley, and several other towns, is considered part of a region known as the High Desert.

According to the United States Census Bureau, the CDP covers an area of 60.1 square miles (155.7 km), all of it land.

Demographics
In May 2010, the United States Census Bureau made Phelan its own separate CDP for statistical purposes.

The 2010 United States Census reported that Phelan had a population of 14,304. The racial makeup of Phelan was 10,807 (75.6%) White (63.3% Non-Hispanic White), 276 (1.9%) African American, 139 (1.0%) Native American, 446 (3.1%) Asian, 20 (0.1%) Pacific Islander, 1,993 (13.9%) from other races, and 623 (4.4%) from two or more races. Hispanic or Latino of any race were 4,128 persons (28.9%).

The Census reported that 14,267 people (99.7% of the population) lived in households, 37 (0.3%) lived in non-institutionalized group quarters, and 0 (0%) were institutionalized.

There were 4,581 households, out of which 1,883 (41.1%) had children under the age of 18 living in them, 2,705 (59.0%) were opposite-sex married couples living together, 509 (11.1%) had a female householder with no husband present, 360 (7.9%) had a male householder with no wife present. There were 274 (6.0%) unmarried opposite-sex partnerships, and 31 (0.7%) same-sex married couples or partnerships. 788 households (17.2%) were made up of individuals, and 293 (6.4%) had someone living alone who was 65 years of age or older. The average household size was 3.11. There were 3,574 families (78.0% of all households); the average family size was 3.48.

The population was spread out, with 3,921 people (27.4%) under the age of 18, 1,417 people (9.9%) aged 18 to 24, 3,188 people (22.3%) aged 25 to 44, 4,232 people (29.6%) aged 45 to 64, and 1,546 people (10.8%) who were 65 years of age or older. The median age was 37.9 years. For every 100 females, there were 104.1 males. For every 100 females age 18 and over, there were 102.8 males.

The homeowner vacancy rate was 2.9%; the rental vacancy rate was 4.9%. 10,934 people (76.4% of the population) lived in owner-occupied housing units and 3,333 people (23.3%) lived in rental housing units.

According to the 2010 United States Census, Phelan had a median household income of $52,639, with 15.3% of the population living below the federal poverty line.

History

Origin
Phelan's history dates back to the days of the Mormon Trail, when settlers passed through the area on their way to San Bernardino and points beyond. Phelan was named after Senator James D. Phelan and his brother, John Thomas (J.T) Phelan.

Education
The town is in the Snowline Joint Unified School District, which also serves  Wrightwood, Piñon Hills, Baldy Mesa, Oak Hills, and the West Cajon Valley. The area's schools include Piñon Mesa Middle School, Serrano High School (named after the Serrano people), Quail Valley Middle School, Baldy Mesa Elementary, Piñon Hills Elementary, Wrightwood Elementary, Vista Verde Elementary, Heritage School, Chaparral High School, Desert View Independent School, Eagle Summit Community Day School, and Phelan Elementary.

In 1972, the town was a part of the Phelan School District,  of mostly desert land, with 117 pupils in its elementary school. In April of that year, aggrieved parents kept their children home for one day to protest a decision by the school trustees to bypass popular teacher and acting administrator Carl Rasmussen for appointment as full-time principal of the school.

Library
Phelan is served by two branch libraries of the San Bernardino County system. The first is a shared facility at Serrano High School, and the second, a -building at Lindero Street and Clovis Road, was opened in August 2009. The first memorial library in the county system, the facility is dedicated to local service veterans. Its collection was helped by donations through the Friends of the Library organization. The general contractor was Mark Forbes, with his partners, Robert Masseth and Bob Raymondo. Staffing was increased so that the branch would be open 48 hours a week, compared with just 27 hours at the Serrano branch.

In 2003 Lenore Coale, president of the Friends of the Serrano Library, noted that many patrons received government assistance and relied heavily on the library, which had just suffered a countywide cutback in funding. She said volunteers were using opened books or stuffed animals to fill the gaps in the shelves.

However, in recent years the County Library's budget for purchasing has increased and the library continues to thrive. More information about the library and the services it offers can be found here.

Athletics
High school football featuring the local team, the Diamondbacks, has been an important part of Phelan's social life, with one resident, Rick Weber, saying in 2001 that "Everybody wants to see the kids thrive. Everybody follows the team." Janet Molina, the Serrano High girls' soccer coach, said, "Friday night football is the focus of this community." An active youth sports program has provided a "feeder system" for the high school athletes.

Communication
The ZIP Code is 92371 and 92329 and the community is inside area codes 442 and 760.

References

External links
 Snowline Joint Unified School District
 Serrano High School
 Phelan Chamber of Commerce

Census-designated places in San Bernardino County, California
Populated places in the Mojave Desert
Unincorporated communities in San Bernardino County, California
Victor Valley
Census-designated places in California
Unincorporated communities in California